The Polish Embassy in Copenhagen is the diplomatic mission of the Republic of Poland to the Kingdom of Denmark. The chancery is located at Richelieus Alle 12, Hellerup, Copenhagen.

Building
The embassy is housed within a rococo style building on the banks of the Øresund sound. The main chancery building is adjoined by the ambassador's residence which is also of a rococo architectural style and the embassy's consular complex which was designed in a neo-classical style with elements of Danish baroque architecture such as the tented roof.

See also
Denmark–Poland relations
List of ambassadors of Poland to Denmark
List of diplomatic missions of Poland
Foreign relations of Poland
Polish nationality law

References

External links
Embassy of Poland in Copenhagen 

Poland
Copenhagen
Denmark–Poland relations
Rococo architecture in Copenhagen